Violated is a 1996 Nigerian romantic drama film directed by Amaka Igwe and starring Richard Mofe Damijo and Ego Boyo. The film and its sequel, Violated 2 (or part 2), were released in the home video format in June 1996.

Premise
The film tells the story of a young man, Tega (Richard Mofe Damijo), from a wealthy background  who falls in love and marries Peggy (Ego Boyo) who came from a different background. However, their marriage is put to the test when  hidden secrets unfolds, Tega's ex-wife re-appears in his life and he also learnt about his ex-boss relationship with his wife when she was young.

Cast
Richard Mofe Damijo as Tega
Ego Boyo as Peggy
Kunle Bamtefa as Lois
Joke Silva as Myra
Mildred Iweka as Toms
Taiwo Obileye as "Pinky" Farrell
Wale Macaulay as J.C.
Funlola Aofiyebi-Raimi

Reception
Violated was one of the highest selling home video productions in 1996. At the time of the film's production, Nigeria videos were distributed with the production of a large number of tapes at once and which are then distributed to various marketers. While average sales for films during the period was about 30,000-50,000, Violated sold about 150,000 copies. Information Nigeria listed the film among the best 20 films of Nollywood that will never be forgotten.

References

1996 films
English-language Nigerian films
1990s English-language films
Nigerian romantic drama films
1996 romantic drama films